Abdirahman Aamir Dhuubow was a Somali ruler, and one of Galluweger Sultanate leaders.

Biography
Abdirahman Aamir was a Galluweger Sultan, who had defeated the armies of Diiriye Guure outside of Afgooyee. Much of the Somali Dynasties were somewhat willing to join and/or support the Dervish Army led by Diiriye Guure simply because of his opposition to colonies. Shiek Abdirahman Amir and many other leaders in the South Somalia regions had begun opening diplomatic channels for negotiation with the Dervish. Despite mutual admirations, negotiations foundered due largely to the Galluweger Dynasty and others distrust of the Dervish as a result of the Dervish army slaughtering Maay speaking people and the assassination of Awees (a well known Muslim Sufi). Over 30,000 men from almost all the Maay speaking tribes led by Shiek Abdirahman Aamir inflicted a stunning defeat and repelled the Dervish from all Maay land. This defeat and, the British and the soldiers of Haaji Waraabe ("Haji the Hyena") striking the Dervish settlements in the North Somalia had ended the reign of the Dervish and Diiriye Guure.

Sultans
Ethnic Somali people
Somali sultans
18th-century Somalian people
19th-century Somalian people